Abdollahabad (also Romanized as ‘Abdollāhābād; also known as ‘Abdolābād) is a village in Qohab-e Sarsar Rural District, Amirabad District, Damghan County, Semnan Province, Iran. At the 2006 census, its population was 252, in 78 families.

References 

Populated places in Damghan County